Dharaka is a Maldivian crime thriller web series written directed by Azhan Ibrahim. Produced by Kazmik International, it stars Ahmed Ifnaz Firaq, Washiya Mohamed and Susan Ibrahim Fulhu in main roles.

The series revolves around a high-profile case of the disappearance of a politician's daughter. The story twists and turns as an investigation officer tries to piece together the events leading up to the disappearance and the secrets behind the people involved.

Cast and characters

Main
 Ahmed Ifnaz Firaq as Nawal
 Washiya Mohamed as Nisha Sameer
 Susan Ibrahim Fulhu as Nazima Shakir
 Aisha Ali as Ana; Nisha's best friend
 Ibrahim Jihad as Firushan; husband of Nazima Shakir

Recurring
 Nathasha Jaleel as Fazla
 Ali Usam as Zayan; Nisha's boyfriend
 Mohamed Afrah as Sameer; Nisha's father
 Ismail Waheed as Ahmed
 Fathimath Visama as Iyadha; Nisha's former bestfriend
 Adhuham Layaal Qasim as Raaee
 Shaanih Ali Naseem as Peepu
 Ali Nadheeh as Vildhaan
 Ahmed Nahil as Iyadha's friend

Episodes

Soundtrack

Release and reception
On 15 March 2022, it was announced that the series would be made available for streaming on MediaNet Multi Screen platform from 8 April 2022. The first episode of the series met with widespread positive reviews from critics and audience, where the performance of actors including Susan Ibrahim Fulhu, Washiya Mohamed and Ahmed Ifnaz Firaq were particularly praised with the "suspense and well-crafted" direction from Azhan Ibrahim. Reviewing the finale of the series, Ahmed Rasheed from MuniAvas considered the series to be an "excellent watch, if you are interested in good quality series".

References

Serial drama television series
Maldivian television shows
Maldivian web series